Fernanda Ignacia Araya Toloza (born 12 October 1994) is a Chilean footballer who plays as a left winger for American college OVU Fighting Scots and the Chile women's national team.

International career
Araya represented Chile at the 2014 South American U-20 Women's Championship. At senior level, she played the 2014 South American Games and the 2014 Copa América Femenina.

International goals
Scores and results list Chile's goal tally first

References 

1994 births
Living people
Footballers from Santiago
Chilean women's footballers
Women's association football wingers
Universidad de Chile footballers
Ohio Valley University alumni
Chile women's international footballers
Competitors at the 2014 South American Games
South American Games silver medalists for Chile
South American Games medalists in football
Chilean expatriate women's footballers
Chilean expatriate sportspeople in the United States
Expatriate women's soccer players in the United States